Noretta Koertge is an American philosopher of science noted for her work on Karl Popper and scientific rationality.

Career
She worked since 1981 as a Professor in the Department of History and Philosophy of Science at Indiana University and is now an Emeritus Professorship. She was editor-in-chief of the journal (1999–2004) Philosophy of Science, her election as a Fellow, in 1999, by American Association for the Advancement of Science and her being Editor-in-Chief of The New Dictionary of Scientific Biography (2004–2008). She is also a novelist.

Selected publications

Novels

References

Philosophers of science
20th-century American philosophers
Critics of postmodernism
Academic journal editors
American women philosophers
Alumni of the University of London
Indiana University Bloomington faculty
20th-century American women
Critical rationalists